Water Street is located in downtown St. John's, Newfoundland and Labrador, Canada. It became a commercial trading outpost for the Basques, French, Spanish, Portuguese, and English. The street now boasts many souvenir shops, restaurants, pubs, and high-end boutiques, as well as other commercial ventures. To this day the street remains the hub of commercial activity in the city and in 2020 the city implemented a seasonal pedestrian-only section of the road.

National Historic Site
The Water Street Historic District was designated a National Historic Site of Canada in 1987 and comprises a group of commercial structures which are representative of the 19th-century mercantile businesses associated with the Newfoundland fisheries and the Atlantic trade.

References
 

Streets in St. John's, Newfoundland and Labrador
16th-century establishments in Canada
National Historic Sites in Newfoundland and Labrador